Michel "Mitch" Couriard MBE (20 December 1953 – 23 October 2015)  was a Jersey vingtenier and civil servant.

Biography
He originally qualified as an electrician, but after a number of years of voluntary service with the Jersey Youth Service and took a position at the Department of Education.

He was one of Jersey's torchbearers in the 2012 Summer Olympics torch relay. He was painted for the Peoples Choice portrait in 2013 by royal portrait painter Christian Furr Mitch's portrait hangs in the Jersey Heritage Jersey Museum and Art Gallery.

On 18 August 2015, Mitch married his second wife Kaye Temple at Southampton Hospital. Couriard died of cancer, aged 61, at the Jersey Hospice on 23 October 2015. His funeral, which was held on 8 November 2015 at the Parish Church of St Helier, attracted hundreds of people.

Parish Municipality
Couriard was a member of the Honorary Police having been elected to serve as a vingtenier for the Vingtaine du Mont à l'Abbé in Saint Helier, Jersey. He was also president of the Honorary Police Association.

Couriard's "beat" includes Victoria Avenue, meaning that he is delegated to manage policing for the annual Battle of Flowers held in August - an event that continues to attract crowds of 10,000 or more. As such he was one of the most visible members of the island's Honorary Police.

Member of the Order of the British Empire
He was awarded membership of the Order of the British Empire in the Queen's birthday honours list of June 2002 jointly for his services as a civil servant and his honorary work.

References

Municipality members of Jersey
People from Saint Helier
Honours recipients from Jersey
Members of the Order of the British Empire
1953 births
2015 deaths